Information Age Publishing Inc. (IAP) is a publisher of academic books, primarily in the fields of education and management. It was founded in 1999 by George Johnson and is located in Charlotte, North Carolina.

References

External links
 

Book publishing companies based in North Carolina
Companies based in Charlotte, North Carolina
Publishing companies established in 1999
1999 establishments in North Carolina